Nesher is a city in the Haifa District of Israel. It was founded in 1923 as a workers town for the Nesher Cement factory, the first cement factory in the country.

History

Nesher was founded in 1924 as a workers town for the Nesher Cement factory, established in September 1923 by Michael Pollack, a Jewish industrialist from Russia. The area was swampy and malaria-infested, but employees of the factory gradually moved there with their families, bringing the population to 1,500. Nesher was floated as a public company in 1925. In 1929, the Arabs of Balad al-Sheikh attacked the factory and burned down a farm.

By the mid-1930s, Nesher Cement had 700 employees, both Jewish and Arab.

In 1948, thousands of Jewish immigrants from Europe, Iraq and North Africa settled in Nesher. The town also expanded over the Palestinian village of Balad al-Sheikh, immediately north-west of Old Nesher, after it was depopulated during the 1947–1948 civil war in Mandatory Palestine. A portion of the Tel Hanan neighborhood of the city was built over the village. In 1952, a local council was formed comprising four neighborhoods – Nesher, Giv’at Nesher, Ben-Dor and Tel Hanan. The first mayor was Yehuda Shimroni.

Demographics 
CBS statistics for 2005 show Nesher's ethnic makeup as 99.5% Jewish and other non-Arabs. 30.7% of the population in 2005 were immigrants who came to Israel after 1990.

Education 
The city's education system comprises six elementary schools, one comprehensive high school, two middle schools and 36 kindergartens and day care centers with an enrollment of 4,000 pupils. Over 70% of Nesher's high school students take the Bagrut matriculation exams, with a pass rate of 98%, one of the highest rates in Israel. Nesher's high school won the Israeli Education Prize twice in the span of a decade.

Twinning and cultural exchange
In 2005, the Broward County Jewish Federation established a partnership with Nesher in an effort to create a people-to-people cultural exchange program that includes high school and college student exchanges and video conferencing for events such as school celebrations and concerts.

Emblem
The municipal emblem was designed by David Hollod and approved at a local committee meeting on the 24th of October 1962. It includes multiple references:
 The vulture represents the name of the city and the cement factory from its inception.
 The 4 hills represent the mountainous terrain and the four original neighborhoods that constituted the settlement–Ben Dor, Tel Hanan, Nesher, and Givat Nesher.
 The factory and chimney represent the industrial foundation the city was established upon.
 The tree represents the growth and prosperity of the city over the years.

Gallery

References

External links 

 

Cities in Israel
Cities in Haifa District
Populated places established in 1925
1925 establishments in Mandatory Palestine